Stephen Vincent may refer to:

 Stéphen Vincent (footballer) (born 1986), French footballer
 Steven Vincent (1955–2005), American author and journalist
 Steven Vincent (choreographer), American choreographer, dancer, teacher and entertainer
Stephen Vincent (dancer) (born 1989) professional UK dancer on Dancing with the Stars (Irish TV series).